The 1916–17 William & Mary Indians men's basketball team represented the College of William & Mary in intercollegiate basketball during the 1916–17 season. Under the first (and only) year of head coach Samuel H. Hubbard, the team finished the season with a 4–9 record. This was the 12th season in program history for William & Mary, whose nickname is now the Tribe.

William & Mary played in-state rival Virginia Tech for the first time during 1917.

Schedule

|-
!colspan=9 style="background:#006400; color:#FFD700;"| Regular season

Source

References

William & Mary Tribe men's basketball seasons
William And Mary Indians
William and Mary Indians Men's Basketball Team
William and Mary Indians Men's Basketball Team